Sylvia Dethier (born 20 May 1965 in Acosse) is a retired Belgian athlete who specialised in the sprint hurdles. She represented her country at the 1988 and 1992 Summer Olympics, as well as one outdoor and three indoor World Championships.

Her personal bests are 12.98 seconds in the 100 metres hurdles (Brussels 1991) and 8.09 seconds in the 60 metres hurdles (Hoboken 1993).

She has a twin sister, Françoise, who was also a hurdler.

Competition record

References

1965 births
Living people
Belgian female hurdlers
Athletes (track and field) at the 1988 Summer Olympics
Athletes (track and field) at the 1992 Summer Olympics
Olympic athletes of Belgium
World Athletics Championships athletes for Belgium
Sportspeople from Liège Province